Yungchen Lhamo (Tibetan: དབྱངས་ཅན་ལྷ་མོ, lhamo meaning "goddess of song") is a Tibetan singer-songwriter living in the United States. She won the ARIA Award for Best World Music Album in 1995 and was then signed by Peter Gabriel's Real World record label.

Life and career
Lhamo's name means "goddess of song" (lhamo), a name given to her by a Buddhist monk at birth.

Lhamo left Tibet in 1989 to make a pilgrimage to Dharamsala. She was inspired to reach out to the world through her music. She moved to Australia in 1993, then to New York City in 2000.

Lhamo's Australian debut album, Tibetan Prayer, produced by John Prior, won the ARIA Award for Best World Music Album in 1995. The success of that record led to her signing with Peter Gabriel's Real World label. Her first record for the label, Tibet, Tibet, mainly features a cappella renditions of original compositions—authentic Tibetan Buddhist prayers and songs. Her next recording, Coming Home, was a collaboration with producer Hector Zazou, showcasing her voice and also featuring chanting by Tibetan monks, a wide range of mostly modern Western instruments and the benefits of multi-track recording which enabled Lhamo's voice to be layered repeatedly.

According to the Times Herald Record, Lhamo has toured extensively in at least 70 countries, singing a combination of her own songs and traditional Buddhist chants and mantras. She has performed and recorded with other artists, including Natalie Merchant, Peter Gabriel, Annie Lennox, Billy Corgan, and Bono. Lhamo's recordings have been used in the film Seven Years in Tibet and many Tibetan documentaries. She has performed at venues such as London's Royal Festival Hall, New York City's Carnegie Hall, and Berlin's Philharmonic Hall. She has also performed at the Lilith Fair festival and toured as a part of the WOMAD world music festivals.

Lhamo's album Ama (which means "Mother" in the Tibetan language) was released in April 2006 and was produced by Iranian-American musician Jamshied Sharifi. Featured artists include Annie Lennox on the song Fade Away and Joy Askew on the song Tara.

In November 2007, Lhamo accompanied a site-specific dance work called "Walking The Line" by American choreographer Bill T. Jones at the Louvre Museum in Paris. The performance, which also featured solo percussion by Florent Jodelet, took place in a 300-foot space stretching from Michelangelo's statue The Dying Slave to the foot of the staircase leading to the sculpture Winged Victory of Samothrace.

Lhamo's fifth album, Tayatha (meaning "It Is Like This") was released in June 2013 by Cantaloupe Music. On this album she collaborated with Russian pianist Anton Batagov.

Lhamo's work with mentally ill and homeless people was covered by Newsweek.

Lhamo released Awakening Album which explores the relevance of compassion-based spirituality to our modern-day, interdependent lives – each song reflecting topics that have become ever-more highlighted by the Covid-19 pandemic. Awakening was a collaboration with Julio Garcia produced in Madrid, Spain and features ‘Loving Kindness’ track, on which Yungchen is joined by flamenco legend Carmen Linares. Lhamo says: “‘Awakening’ aims to appeal to those who are interested in sound healing and spiritual awakening, and, unlike previous albums, uses only English song titles. It is also my first album to include a song in Mandarin. I truly believe that voice has vibrational energy to connect, empower, heal and transform all human beings. I hope these new songs will help bring inner peace and true happiness to everyone who hears them.'"

Discography

Albums

Awards and nominations

ARIA Music Awards
The ARIA Music Awards is an annual awards ceremony that recognises excellence, innovation, and achievement across all genres of Australian music. They commenced in 1987. Yungchen Lhamo won one award.

! 
|-
| 1995
| Tibetan Prayer
| ARIA Award for Best World Music Album
| 
| 
|-

References

or

External links

 Official website
 Profile on the Real World label website
 One Drop of Kindness Foundation website

1960s births
ARIA Award winners
Living people
Performers of Buddhist music
Real World Records artists
Tibetan Buddhist art and culture
Women singer-songwriters
People from Lhasa
21st-century Tibetan women singers
20th-century Tibetan women singers